eSilicon was a fabless semiconductor company founded in 1999 in San Jose, California. eSilicon designs and manufactures digital CMOS and finFET ASICs. In addition, eSilicon designs market-specific semiconductor IP platforms and provides custom IC manufacturing services. eSilicon is considered a pioneer of the fabless ASIC model. They focus on developing and managing the manufacturing process of complex finFET-class chips, 2.5D packaging solutions and advanced semiconductor IP for customers in the high-bandwidth networking, high-performance computing, artificial intelligence (AI) and 5G infrastructure markets.

Locations
eSilicon's headquarters is in San Jose, California. eSilicon has offices in Allentown, Pennsylvania; Shanghai, China; Penang, Malaysia; Bucharest, Romania; Singapore; Taiwan and Vietnam (one design center in Ho Chi Minh City and another in Da Nang).

History
eSilicon was founded in 1999 in San Jose, California, by Anjan AJ Sen. He conceived the concept while attending Harvard Business School in 1997 based on his prior experience as a chip designer. Sen incorporated the company in November 1999, wrote the original business plan, assembled the initial team, and secured key alliances with TSMC and Artisan, all of which subsequently led to Series A financing in March 2000. Since its founding in 1999 eSilicon has received a total of $86M in venture capital. In 2002 eSilicon became widely known as the supplier of a key Apple Inc. iPod ASIC through PortalPlayer. 2004 revenues reached $91M largely driven by ASICs for the iPod. In 2006 Apple announced that they were changing their iPod ASIC strategy and eSilicon no longer supplies ASICs for the iPod. Following the loss of the iPod business eSilicon diversified its customer base and announced in May 2008 that they were profitable and shipping ASICs to over 50 customers. In January 2008 eSilicon acquired the assets of Swedish-based Ethernet networking switch supplier SwitchCore AB and announced that they would seek further acquisitions. Rumors of eSilicon preparing to file for an IPO have circulated on and off since 2003.

In 2011, eSilicon started the MoZAIC™ “Modular Z-axis Integrated Circuit” 2.5D ASIC program to analyze new approaches that would provide more bandwidth for customers. This includes the development of an HBM PHY in 28nm and finFET technologies as well as the study of 2.5D packaging. eSilicon has completed seven test chips to date that verify the HBM PHY IP and assemble a supply chain ecosystem in support of 2.5D integration—design, verification, test and reliability. eSilicon has multiple 14/16nm finFET 2.5D ASICs in design, with several entering production in the first half of 2018.

Products
eSilicon provides physical design, design for test insertion, traditional and 2.5D package design, product qualification, IP licensing, and manufacturing services for digital CMOS and finFET ASICs. eSilicon has announced products in .25 um, .18 um, .13 um, 90 nm, 65 nm, 40 nm, 28 nm and 14 nm process technologies. In 2017, eSilicon announced tapeout to production of one of the first 2.5D ASICs, developed on Samsung 14LPP technology. Customer ASICs have been announced in a wide range of applications including high-bandwidth networking, high-performance computing, digital cameras, hearing aids, portable multimedia players and inkjet printers.

eSilicon specializes in a high-performance, high-bandwidth IP + 2.5D solution that targets networking, high-performance computing, artificial intelligence (AI) and 5G wireless infrastructure applications by offering specialized memories with 2.5GHz worst-case operation with more than a billion searches per second along with the 2.5D integration of 1024 Gbytes/sec data rate high-bandwidth memory (HBM2). Memory and I/O products in this category include ternary content addressable memory (TCAMs), fast cache, multi-port and asynchronous register files and HBM2 PHY.

Manufacturing
As a fabless company eSilicon outsources all semiconductor manufacturing to merchant foundries. Since eSilicon's founding it has had a relationship with TSMC as its primary foundry partner. eSilicon also partners with Samsung Foundry. eSilicon outsources all package assembly and test.

References

External links
eSilicon homepage

Companies established in 2000
Fabless semiconductor companies
Companies based in San Jose, California
Semiconductor companies of the United States